

Season summary
Betis finished fourth, qualifying for the Champions League for the first time in their history. They also won the Copa del Rey.

Squad
Squad at end of season

Left club during season

Competitions

La Liga

League table

References

Real Betis seasons
Real Betis